The 1994 Australian motorcycle Grand Prix was the first round of the 1994 Grand Prix motorcycle racing season. It took place on 27 March 1994 at Eastern Creek Raceway.

500 cc classification
Race was scheduled for 30 laps however spectators stormed the track shortly after the chequered flag when some riders haven't completed the full distance yet. Because of these circumstances the official results were taken at the end of the penultimate lap.

250 cc classification

 Tetsuya Harada suffered a broken hand in a crash during first practice session and withdrew from the event.

125 cc classification

References

Australian motorcycle Grand Prix
Australian
Motorcycle
Motorsport at Eastern Creek Raceway